West High School is the oldest public high school in the U.S. state of Utah. It was founded in 1890, and it is part of the Salt Lake City School District. Its original name was Salt Lake High. The school colors are red and black and the school mascot is a black panther. It has a current enrollment of 2,840.

Athletics
West High has had multiple state sports championships, most prominently twenty-one for football (1898, 1899, 1900, 1901, 1902, 1903, 1904, 1905, 1908, 1909, 1911, 1912, 1913, 1915, 1925, 1927, 1973, 1975, 1980, 1984 and 1992); nine for boys' track (1912, 1922, 1929, 1932, 1933, 1951, 1953, 1954 and 1957); and four for boys' tennis (1992, 1996, 1997 and 2002).

The school maintains a Hall of Fame for prominent athletes.

Notable alumni

Parley Baer, American actor
Paul Bloomquist, American pilot and officer
Shannon Bryner Hale, Author
Clayton Christensen, Harvard Business School professor and bestselling author
Nathan Chen, Figure skater
Tony Finau, PGA golfer
Helen Foster Snow, American journalist
Earl Holding, Owner of Sinclair Oil and Grand America
Tom C. Korologos, US Ambassador
Leonidas Ralph Mecham, U.S. Court Administrator
Thomas S. Monson, Former president of the LDS Church
Dick Nemelka, Professional basketball player in the ABA
Harold Ross, Co-founder of the New Yorker magazine
George Von Elm, Voted the 10th most important amateur golfer in U.S. history
D. Frank Wilkins, Utah Supreme Court Justice
Mark H. Willes, CEO of the LA Times and General Mills
[[Dan Wells]], author

See also
List of high schools in Utah
List of school districts in Utah

Notes

External links

 West High School official website

Public high schools in Utah
Educational institutions established in 1890
Schools in Salt Lake City
International Baccalaureate schools in Utah
1890 establishments in Utah Territory